The Muppets are a group of puppet characters created by Jim Henson, many for the purpose of appearing on the children's television program Sesame Street. Some of the best known Muppets on Sesame Street include Big Bird, Oscar the Grouch, Ernie, Bert, Cookie Monster, Grover, Elmo and Count von Count. Henson's involvement in Sesame Street began when he and Joan Ganz Cooney, one of the creators of the show, met in the summer of 1968, at one of the show's five three-day curriculum planning seminars in Boston. Author Christopher Finch reported that director Jon Stone, who had worked with Henson previously, felt that if they could not bring him on board, they should "make do without puppets".

Henson was initially reluctant but agreed to join Sesame Street in support of its social goals. He also agreed to waive his performance fee for full ownership of the Sesame Street Muppets and to split any revenue they generated with the Children's Television Workshop (renamed to the Sesame Workshop in 2000), the series' non-profit producer. The Muppets were a crucial part of the show's popularity and it brought Henson national attention. The Muppet segments of the show were popular since its premiere, and more Muppets were added during the first few seasons. The Muppets were effective teaching tools because children easily recognized them, they were predictable, and they appealed to adults and older siblings.

During the production of Sesame Streets first season, producers created five one-hour episodes to test the show's appeal to children and examine their comprehension of the material. Not intended for broadcast, they were presented to preschoolers in 60 homes throughout Philadelphia and in day care centers in New York City in July 1969. The results were "generally very positive"; children learned from the shows, their appeal was high, and children's attention was sustained over the full hour. However, the researchers found that although children's attention was high during the Muppet segments, their interest wavered during the "Street" segments, when no Muppets were on screen. This was because the producers had followed the advice of child psychologists who were concerned that children would be confused if human actors and Muppets were shown together. As a result of this decision, the appeal of the test episodes was lower than the target.

The Street scenes were "the glue" that "pulled the show together", so producers knew they needed to make significant changes. The producers decided to reject the advisers' advice and reshot the Street segments; Henson and his coworkers created Muppets that could interact with the human actors, specifically Oscar the Grouch and Big Bird, who became two of the show's most enduring characters. These test episodes were directly responsible for what writer Malcolm Gladwell called "the essence of Sesame Street—the artful blend of fluffy monsters and earnest adults". Since 2001, the full rights for the Muppets created for Sesame Street (which do not include Kermit the Frog) have been owned by Sesame Workshop.

Muppets

See also
 List of human Sesame Street characters
 List of Muppets

Notes

References
 Borgenicht, David (1998). Sesame Street Unpaved. New York: Hyperion Publishing. 
 Clash, Kevin, Gary Brozek & Louis Henry Mitchell (2006). My Life as a Furry Red Monster: What Being Elmo Has Taught Me About Life, Love and Laughing Out Loud. New York: Random House. 
 Davis, Michael (2008). Street Gang: The Complete History of Sesame Street. New York: Viking Penguin. 
 Finch, Christopher (1993). Jim Henson: The Works: The Art, the Magic, the Imagination. New York: Random House. 
 Fisch, Shalom M.; Lewis Bernstein, "Formative Research Revealed: Methodological and Process Issues in Formative Research". In Fisch, Shalom M. & Truglio, Rosemarie T.. G" is for Growing: Thirty Years of Research on Children and Sesame Street. Mahweh, New Jersey: Lawrence Erlbaum Publishers. .
 Gikow, Louise A. (2009). Sesame Street: A Celebration—Forty Years of Life on the Street. New York: Black Dog & Leventhal Publishers. .
 Gladwell, Malcolm (2000). The Tipping Point: How Little Things Can Make a Big Difference. New York: Little, Brown, and Company. 
 Hellman, Peter (November 23, 1987). "Street Smart: How Big Bird & Co. do it". New York Magazine. 20 (46): 48—53. Retrieved August 2, 2019.
 Lesser, Gerald S. (1974). Children and Television: Lessons from Sesame Street. New York: Vintage Books. 
 Morrow, Robert W. (2006). Sesame Street and the Reform of Children's Television. Baltimore, Maryland: Johns Hopkins University Press.

External links
 Sesame Workshop Muppet and Puppeteer Bios

Lists of children's television characters